Thesis is an interdisciplinary German network of young scientists, current and former PhD students in or with some relation to Germany. Thesis is a founding member of the European network of doctoral candidates Eurodoc.

See also

Associação dos Bolseiros de Investigação Cientifica - The equivalent organisation in Portugal.
National Postgraduate Committee - Equivalent organisation in the United Kingdom.
Eurodoc - Eurodoc, the European wide federation of national postgraduate representative bodies.

External links
THESIS website (in German)

National postgraduate representative bodies